Harry Cranbrook Allen  (23 March 1917 – 21 June 1998) was a British historian of the United States.

Biography

Born on 23 March 1917, Harry Cranbrook Allen was educated at Bedford School and at Pembroke College, Oxford, where he was a Scholar and gained a first class degree in Modern History. He was elected as a Fellow by the Commonwealth Fund of New York in 1939 (he took up the Fellowship at Harvard University after the Second World War). He served during the Second World War with the Hertfordshire Regiment and the Dorset Regiment in France and Germany, was promoted to the rank of Major, awarded the Military Cross, and appointed as Commandant of the 43rd Division Educational College, between June and November 1945.

He was Fellow and Tutor in Modern History at Lincoln College, Oxford, between 1946 and 1955, Commonwealth Fund Professor of American History at University College London, between 1955 and 1971, and Director of the Institute of United States Studies at the University of London, between 1966 and 1971. He was Professor of American Studies at the University of East Anglia, between 1971 and 1980, Dean of the School of English and American Studies at the University of East Anglia, between 1974 and 1976, and Emeritus Professor of American Studies at the University of East Anglia, between 1980 and 1998.

He was Senior Research Fellow at the Australian National University, Canberra, and Visiting Scholar at the University of California, Berkeley, between 1953 and 1954, Schouler Lecturer at Johns Hopkins University, in 1956, American Studies Fellow at the Commonwealth Fund of New York, in 1957, Visiting Member of the Institute for Advanced Study, Princeton, New Jersey, in 1959, Visiting Professor at the University of Rochester, in 1963, and Visiting Professor at the University of Michigan, in 1966.

Allen was made a Fellow of the Royal Historical Society in 1955, Chairman of the British Association for American Studies, between 1974 and 1977, and President of the European Association for American Studies, between 1976 and 1980. He died in Philadelphia on 21 June 1998, aged 81.

Publications

Great Britain and the United States, 1955
British Essays in American History, 1957
Bush and Backwoods, 1959
The Anglo-American Relationship Since 1783, 1959
The Anglo-American Predicament, 1960
The United States of America, 1964
Contrast and Connection, 1976

References

1917 births
1998 deaths
People educated at Bedford School
Alumni of Pembroke College, Oxford
Academics of the University of Oxford
Academics of University College London
Academics of the University of East Anglia
Fellows of Lincoln College, Oxford
British Army personnel of World War II
Recipients of the Military Cross
British expatriate academics in the United States
Fellows of the Royal Historical Society
University of Michigan faculty
20th-century British historians
Hertfordshire Regiment officers
Dorset Regiment officers
British expatriates in the United States